The 1906 North Carolina A&M Aggies football team represented the North Carolina A&M Aggies of North Carolina College of Agriculture and Mechanic Arts during the 1906 college football season. In Willie Heston's first and only season as head coach, the Aggies compiling a record of 3–1–4, outscoring their opponents 100 to 10. The four ties are the most in program history.

Schedule

References

North Carolina AandM
NC State Wolfpack football seasons
North Carolina AandM Aggies football